Rongellen is a municipality in the canton of Graubünden in Switzerland, located in the Viamala Region.

History
Rongellen is first mentioned in 1344 as Rungal.

Geography
Of this area, 15.2% is used for agricultural purposes, while 63.2% is forested. Of the rest of the land, 5.4% is settled (buildings or roads) and the remainder (16.2%) is non-productive (rivers, glaciers or mountains).

Before 2017, the municipality was located in the Schams sub-district, of the Hinterrhein district, after 2017 it was part of the Viamala Region.  It consists of scattered individual farm houses and small groups of houses in a clearing along the old Viamala road.

Demographics
, 11.1% of the population was made up of foreign nationals. Over the last 10 years the population has decreased at a rate of -4.3%.

, the gender distribution of the population was 53.3% male and 46.7% female.  The age distribution, in Rongellen is; 2 people or 3.8% of the population are between 0 and 9 years old.  2 people or 3.8% are 10 to 14, and 11 people or 20.8% are 15 to 19.  Of the adult population, 8 people or 15.1% of the population are between 20 and 29 years old.  7 people or 13.2% are 30 to 39, 5 people or 9.4% are 40 to 49, and 8 people or 15.1% are 50 to 59.  The senior population distribution is 2 people or 3.8% of the population are between 60 and 69 years old, 7 people or 13.2% are 70 to 79, there is 1 person or 1.9% who is 80 to 89.

In the 2007 federal election the most popular party was the SVP which received 65.6% of the vote.  The next two most popular parties were the FDP (11.1%) and the CVP (10%).

In Rongellen about 69.6% of the population (between age 25–64) have completed either non-mandatory upper secondary education or additional higher education (either university or a Fachhochschule).

Rongellen has an unemployment rate of 4.8%.  , there were 3 people employed in the primary economic sector and about 1 business involved in this sector.   No one is employed in the secondary sector and there are no businesses in this sector.  3 people are employed in the tertiary sector, with 1 business in this sector.

The historical population is given in the following table:

Languages
Most of the population speaks German (88.7%), with Romansh being second most common ( 9.4%) and Klaf being third (sdja%).

References

 
Municipalities of Graubünden